Pelorus  may refer to:

Places
 Pelorus (Sicily), a peninsula of the island of Sicily
 Pelorus Island, an island in Queensland
 Pelorus Islet, an islet in South Australia
 Pelorus River, a river in the South Island of New Zealand
 Pelorus Sound / Te Hoiere, in the Marlborough Sounds of New Zealand
 Pelorus (Πέλωρος), an ancient Greek name for, probably, the modern-day Aragvi; see Artoces of Iberia

Ships
 , several Royal Navy ships
 Pelorus (yacht), a 2001 luxury yacht
 , a Royal Navy cruiser class

Other
 Pelorus (instrument), a navigational instrument
 Pelorus Jack, a dolphin
 Pelorus Research, a trading name of Holdingham Group Limited
 In Greek mythology, Pelorus was one of the Spartoi